The following is a list of dinghy classes designed before 1960.

Classic one design dinghy and small keelboat classes

Classic development dinghy classes

See also
 Classic keelboat classes
 Dinghy racing
 Dinghy sailing
 Olympic sailing classes

References